National Awami Party (Bhashani) is a left wing political party in Bangladesh.

History
National Awami Party (Bhashani) was established on 30 November 1967 when National Awami Party split into two different fractions. The pro-Moscow fraction was National Awami Party (Wali), led by Khan Abdul Wali Khan, and the pro-Beijing was called National Awami Party (Bhashani), led by Abdul Hamid Khan Bhashani. On 17 November 1974, two leaders of the party, Kazi Zafar Ahmed and Rashed Khan Menon, formed a new political party called United People's Party. Following this split, Bhashani resigned from post of Party President.

See also 

 National Awami Party (Muzaffar) or Bangladesh National Awami Party, successor of the Wali faction
 Bangladesh National Awami Party-Bangladesh NAP, successor of the Bhashani faction

References

 
1967 establishments in East Pakistan
Political parties established in 1967
Political parties in Bangladesh
Socialist parties in Bangladesh